Alicia Helen Barrett (born 25 March 1998) is a British hurdler. She competed in the women's 100 metres hurdles at the 2017 World Championships in Athletics.

References

External links

1998 births
Living people
Place of birth missing (living people)
British female hurdlers
English female hurdlers
World Athletics Championships athletes for Great Britain
Commonwealth Games competitors for England
Athletes (track and field) at the 2018 Commonwealth Games
British Athletics Championships winners
Alumni of Sheffield Hallam University